The Bombala Times and Monaro and Coast Districts General Advertiser  is an English language newspaper that is published in Bombala, New South Wales, Australia that was established in 1863. It now normally referred to as the Bombala Times.

History 
The Bombala Times and Monaro and Coast Districts General Advertiser is a weekly publication that began in 1863.  The publication consisted of local news, advertising and serial fiction. In 1911 the paper absorbed The Bombala herald and Delegate, Cooma, Eden and Coast Districts general advertiser.

Digitisation 
The various versions of the paper have been digitised as part of the Australian Newspapers Digitisation Program project hosted by the National Library of Australia.

See also 
 List of newspapers in New South Wales

References

External links

Bibliography 
 Holden, W Sprague 1961, Australia goes to press, Melbourne University Press, Melbourne.
 Mayer, Henry 1964, The press in Australia, Lansdowne Press, Melbourne.
 Walker, R B 1976, The newspaper press in New South Wales 1803-1920, Sydney University Press, Sydney.

Newspapers published in New South Wales
1863 establishments in Australia
Newspapers on Trove